1040 Klumpkea, provisional designation , is a Tirela asteroid from the outer regions of the asteroid belt, approximately  in diameter. It was discovered on 20 January 1925, by Russian–French astronomer Benjamin Jekhowsky at the Algiers Observatory in North Africa. This highly elongated asteroid is the largest member of the stony Tirela family – also known as the Klumpkea family – and has a longer than average rotation period of 59.2 hours. It was named after American astronomer Dorothea Klumpke.

Orbit and classification 

Klumpkea is the largest member of the Tirela family, a large asteroid family of more than a thousand members which has been further divided into 8 different subclusters. The family is named after 1400 Tirela. Alternatively it is also known as the Klumpkea family by Milani and Knežević.

It orbits the Sun in the outer asteroid belt at a distance of 2.5–3.7 AU once every 5 years and 6 months (2,006 days; semi-major axis of 3.11 AU). Its orbit has an eccentricity of 0.19 and an inclination of 17° with respect to the ecliptic. The body's observation arc begins at Algiers on its official discovery observation in January 1925.

Naming 

This minor planet was named after American astronomer Dorothea Klumpke (1861–1943), spouse of Welsh astronomer Isaac Roberts (1829–1904). Dorothea Klumpke was the first woman to receive the degree of Doctor of Mathematical Sciences at the Sorbonne University in Paris, France. The official naming citation was mentioned in The Names of the Minor Planets by Paul Herget in 1955. The asteroid 339 Dorothea has also been named in her honor by its discoverer Max Wolf.

Physical characteristics 

Klumpkea spectral type is uncertain. Although the overall spectral type of the Tirela/Klumpkea family is that of a stony S-type, which agrees with observations by the WISE/Akari surveys, the Collaborative Asteroid Lightcurve Link (CALL) assumes it to be a carbonaceous C-type asteroid, based on the low albedo measured by SIMPS (see below).

Rotation period and pole 

In February 2002, a rotational lightcurve of Klumpkea was obtained from seven consecutive nights of photometric observations by Robert Stephens at his Santana Observatory  in California. Lightcurve analysis was difficult and only gave a provisional rotation period of  hours with a high brightness amplitude of 0.77 magnitude, indicative of an elongated shape.

In 2016, a modeled lightcurve gave a concurring sidereal period of  hours using data from the Uppsala Asteroid Photometric Catalogue, the Palomar Transient Factory survey, and individual observers (such as above), as well as sparse-in-time photometry from the NOFS, the Catalina Sky Survey, and the La Palma surveys . The study also determined a spin axis for Klumpkea of (172.0°, 48.0°) in ecliptic coordinates (λ, β).

Diameter and albedo 

According to the surveys carried out by the Infrared Astronomical Satellite IRAS, the Japanese Akari satellite and the NEOWISE mission of NASA's Wide-field Infrared Survey Explorer, Klumpkea measures between 22.34 and 34.98 kilometers in diameter and its surface has an albedo between 0.063 and 0.245. CALL assumes a carbonaceous standard albedo of 0.057 and calculates a diameter of 44.22 kilometers based on an absolute magnitude of 10.5.

References

External links 
 Lightcurve Database Query (LCDB), at www.minorplanet.info
 Dictionary of Minor Planet Names, Google books
 Discovery Circumstances: Numbered Minor Planets (1)-(5000) – Minor Planet Center
 
 

001040
Discoveries by Benjamin Jekhowsky
Named minor planets
19250120